George Arthur Shaw (born 15 August 1932) is a former Australian politician.

He was born in Tasmania. In 1968 he was elected to the Tasmanian Legislative Council as the independent member for Macquarie. From 1982 to 1986 he was Chair of Committees, and he was elected President in 1988, serving until 1992. Shaw retired from politics in 1998.

References

1932 births
Living people
Independent members of the Parliament of Tasmania
Members of the Tasmanian Legislative Council
20th-century Australian politicians